Dhaneswar Majhi is  an Indian politician. He was a Member of Parliament, representing Odisha in the Rajya Sabha the upper house of India's Parliament as a member of the Janata Party.

In 1971, 1974, 2000, 2004, and 2014 Odisha Vidhansabh election, Majhi elected from Kesinga and Narla Vidhan Sabha constituency to 5th, 6th, 12th, 13th, and 15th Odisha Legislative Assembly respectively.

References

Rajya Sabha members from Odisha
Janata Party politicians
1941 births
Living people
People from Kalahandi district
Biju Janata Dal politicians
Bharatiya Janata Party politicians from Odisha
Swatantra Party politicians
Members of the Odisha Legislative Assembly
Odisha MLAs 1971–1973
Odisha MLAs 1974–1977
Odisha MLAs 2000–2004
Odisha MLAs 2004–2009
Odisha MLAs 2014–2019